Elisabeth Geertruida Wassenbergh (1729, Groningen – 1781, Groningen) was an 18th-century painter from the Northern Netherlands.

Biography

According to Jan van Gool, she followed her father Jan Abel Wassenbergh in his art, while her sister became good at embroidering fruit and flowers.

According to the Rijksbureau voor Kunsthistorische Documentatie (RKD), she was the daughter of Jan Abel Wassenbergh (I). She is known for miniatures and genre works. A self-portrait by her dated 1754, was bought by the husband of a grand-niece at an auction sale in 1800.

References

Wassenbergh biography by Huygens Institute

1729 births
1781 deaths
18th-century Dutch painters
Painters from Groningen
Dutch women painters
18th-century Dutch women artists